Alassane Ouédraogo (born 7 September 1980) is a Burkinabé former professional football midfielder.

International career
Ouédraogo is a member of the Burkina Faso national football team having played 29 games and scored five goals.

References

1980 births
Living people
People from Centre-Nord Region
Association football midfielders
Burkinabé footballers
Burkina Faso international footballers
1998 African Cup of Nations players
2000 African Cup of Nations players
2002 African Cup of Nations players
Burkinabé expatriate footballers
Santos FC Ouagadougou footballers
Expatriate footballers in Belgium
R. Charleroi S.C. players
Expatriate footballers in Germany
1. FC Köln players
1. FC Köln II players
Rot-Weiß Oberhausen players
TuS Koblenz players
Rot-Weiss Essen players
SC Fortuna Köln players
Belgian Pro League players
Bundesliga players
2. Bundesliga players
21st-century Burkinabé people